The name Yaning has been used for five tropical cyclones in the Philippines by the PAGASA in the Western Pacific Ocean.

 Tropical Storm Faye (1974) (Yaning) – a tropical storm that affected the Philippines, Vietnam and Thailand.
 Tropical Storm Nina (1978) (T7823, 24W, Yaning) – a tropical storm that crossed the Philippines, killing 59, and then made landfall in Eastern China.
 Tropical Depression 25W (1982) (25W, Yaning) – a tropical depression northeast of the Philippines.
 Typhoon Kim (1986) (T8626, 23W, Yaning) – a Category 4 super typhoon that remained over the open ocean.
 Tropical Depression Yaning (1994) – a short-lived depression that formed near the Visayas.

Pacific typhoon set index articles